Gephyromantis leucocephalus is a species of frog in the family Mantellidae. It is endemic to southeastern Madagascar and found from Midongy-du-Sud south to Tôlanaro. It is very abundant species, but it is threatened by the loss and degradation of its forest habitat. It is found in the Andohahela and Midongy du sud National Parks.

References

leucocephalus
Endemic frogs of Madagascar
Taxa named by Fernand Angel
Amphibians described in 1930
Taxonomy articles created by Polbot